The First Church of Jamaica Plain is a historic church at 6 Eliot Street in the Jamaica Plain neighborhood of Boston, Massachusetts.  The stone Gothic Revival church was designed in 1854 by the well known Boston architect, Nathaniel J. Bradlee, for a congregation which was established in 1769 as the Third Church of Roxbury.  It is built out of ashlar granite, laid in courses without ornament.  It has a square tower with Gothic arched windows at the second level, a clock face at the third, and Gothic louvered openings at the belfry, and a parapeted top.  A Shingle style parish hall was added in 1889. This new addition was designed by Cabot, Everett & Mead.

The church was listed on the National Register of Historic Places in 1988, and included in the Monument Square Historic District in 1990.

See also

National Register of Historic Places listings in southern Boston, Massachusetts
First Church in Jamaica Plain, Unitarian Universalist

References

Churches in Boston
Churches on the National Register of Historic Places in Massachusetts
Stone churches in Massachusetts
Jamaica Plain, Boston
National Register of Historic Places in Boston
Historic district contributing properties in Massachusetts